Hagbart Haakonsen (born 15 November 1895; died 20 January 1984) was a Norwegian cross-country skier.

He was born in Grue, Norway.

Haakonsen shared the Holmenkollen medal with Einar Lindboe in 1927. Haakonsen finished fifth in 18 km cross country event at the 1928 Winter Olympics as well as at the 1929 FIS Nordic World Ski Championships. He was the first true cross-country skier to win the Holmenkollen medal.

Cross-country skiing results
All results are sourced from the International Ski Federation (FIS).

Olympic Games

World Championships

References

External links

Holmenkollen medalists - click Holmenkollmedaljen for downloadable pdf file 

1895 births
1984 deaths
People from Grue, Norway
Norwegian male cross-country skiers
Olympic cross-country skiers of Norway
Cross-country skiers at the 1928 Winter Olympics
Holmenkollen medalists
Sportspeople from Innlandet